Wilson Kiprotich may refer to:

Wilson Kiprotich Kebenei (born 1980), Kenyan long-distance runner and World Road Running Championships medallist
Wilson Kipsang Kiprotich (born 1982), Kenyan long-distance road runner and Frankfurt marathon winner